The 2021 Richmond Spiders football team represented the University of Richmond as a member of the Colonial Athletic Association (CAA) in the 2021 NCAA Division I FCS football season. The Spiders, led by fifth-year head coach Russ Huesman, played their home games at E. Claiborne Robins Stadium.

Previous season

Due to the COVID-19 pandemic, the CAA delayed the fall 2020 season and played an abbreviated schedule in the spring of 2021. The Spiders finished the season with a record of 3–1 in CAA play to finish second in the CAA's South Division. The Spiders were ranked No. 15 in the final STATS FCS poll and No. 14 in the final Coaches Poll.

Preseason

CAA poll
In the CAA preseason poll released on July 27, 2021, the Spiders were predicted to finish in fourth place and received two first-place votes.

Preseason All-CAA team
Graduate student tight end John Fitzgerald, senior offensive lineman Clayton McConnell, senior defensive lineman Kobie Turner, graduate student linebacker Tyler Dressler, and sophomore linebacker Tristan Wheeler were named to the CAA preseason all-conference team. Junior kick returner Aaron Dykes was named honorable mention for the all-conference team.

Schedule

Ranking movements

References

Richmond
Richmond Spiders football seasons
Richmond Spiders football